Veronica Campbell-Brown CD ( Campbell; born 15 May 1982) is a retired Jamaican track and field sprinter, who specialized in the 100 and 200 meters. An eight-time Olympic medalist, she is the second of three women in history to win two consecutive Olympic 200 m events, after Bärbel Wöckel of Germany at the 1976 and 1980 Olympics and before fellow countrywoman Elaine Thompson-Herah at the 2016 and 2020 Olympics. Campbell Brown is one of only nine athletes to win world championships at the youth, junior, and senior level of an athletic event.

She holds personal bests of 10.76 seconds for the 100 m and 21.74 seconds for the 200 m. She was the 100 m gold medallist at the 2007 World Championships in Athletics and the 200 m gold medallist at the 2011 World Championships in Athletics. She has also won seven silver medals and one bronze medal in her career at the World Championships in Athletics. Over 60 metres, she is a two-time champion at the IAAF World Indoor Championships.

Early life
Campbell was born to Cecil Campbell and Pamela Bailey in Clarks Town, Trelawny, Jamaica on 15 May 1982. She has five brothers and four sisters and attended Troy Primary and Vere Technical High School in Clarendon before pursuing higher education in the United States at the University of Arkansas.

Junior career
In 1999, she won two gold medals, the 100 m and 4 x 100 m relay at the inaugural IAAF World Youth Championships. The following year, she became the first female to win the sprint double at the IAAF World Junior Championships. She took the 100 m in 11.12 s (which was a championship record at the time) and the 200 m in 22.87 s. At the 2000 Olympic Games, she ran the second leg on the silver medal winning 4 x 100 m relay team. In 2001, she was awarded the Austin Sealy Trophy for the
most outstanding athlete of the 2001 CARIFTA Games. That year, she won 3 gold medals (100 m, 200 m, and 4 × 100 m relay) in the junior (U-20) category.

College career
Campbell attended Barton County Community College in Great Bend, Kansas, where she set several records and won many titles, including four national junior college titles in the 60, 100 and 200 metres both indoors and outdoors. She holds the current record for Barton County CC in the outdoor 100 m and 200 m. Campbell also excelled academically, earning an associate degree from Barton County in 2002 with a 3.8 grade average. She later attended the University of Arkansas, where she stood out as a sprint star in a programme dominated by long-distance runners.

Professional career
At 18 years old, Campbell-Brown won the first Olympic medal of her illustrious career. She competed at the 2000 Summer Olympics in the 4 x 100 m relay along with Tayna Lawrence, Beverly McDonald, Merlene Frazer and sprint veteran and Olympic legend, Merlene Ottey where the team finished second in the finals in a time of 42.13 seconds behind Caribbean neighbors, Bahamas. Campbell Brown had shown herself to be a promising athlete as a junior, having won at the junior level and at Jamaica's yearly Boys and Girls Championship for her high school Vere technical High. The Championship has been credited as the engineer behind Jamaica's success on Track and Field World stage.  

At the age of 22, Campbell-Brown represented Jamaica at the 2004 Athens Olympics.. She competed in both the 100 m and 200 m. In the finals of the 100 m she placed third. Campbell Brown later competed in the 200 m finals, a race American Allyson Felix was favored to win. VCB went on to decimate the field in the 200 m finals. She ran a blistering curve, and held her form down the final stretch to become the first Jamaican and Caribbean woman in the history of the Olympic games to win a sprint Olympic title. At the medal ceremony, a visibly emotional Campbell Brown was brought to tears as her national anthem was played in the stadium and flag hoisted.

Campbell-Brown then teamed up with Aleen Bailey, Tayna Lawrence, and Sherone Simpson in the finals of the 4 × 100 m. VCB ran a scintillating anchor leg as Jamaica went on to win the women's 4 × 100 m. Jamaica created history as it was the first time Jamaica had won the 4 × 100 m relay at the Olympics.

In August 2005, Campbell won the silver medal in the 100 m at the 2005 World Championships in Athletics. She won another silver medal in the 4 x 100 m relay (together with Daniele Browning, Aleen Bailey and Sherone Simpson).

At the 2007 World Championships, Campbell won three medals, a gold in the 100 m, silver in the 200 m (second to Felix) and silver in the 4 x 100 m relay.

At the 2008 Jamaican Olympic trials, she finished fourth in the 100 m, thereby missing the qualifying requirement to automatically make the Jamaican Olympic roster for that event. She clocked 10.88 s in the final, which is the second fastest time ever for a fourth-place finish. She however bounced back to take the 200 m final in what was then a personal best time of 21.94 s. Having failed to qualify for the 100 m, she only competed in the 200 m and the 4 x 100 m relay at the Olympic Games. 

At the opening ceremony of the 2008 Olympics, Veronica Campbell-Brown carried the Jamaican flag during the Athletes' Parade. She successfully defended her Olympic 200 m title in a new personal best time of 21.74 s. She competed at the 4 x 100 m relay together with Shelly-Ann Fraser, Sheri-Ann Brooks and Aleen Bailey. In the first round heats, Jamaica placed first in front of Russia, Germany and China. The Jamaican teams' time of 42.24 s was the first time overall out of sixteen participating nations. With this result, Jamaica qualified for the final, replacing Brooks and Bailey with Sherone Simpson and Kerron Stewart. Jamaica did not finish the race due to a mistake in the baton exchange.

At the end of the 2008 season, Campbell-Brown was selected the top 200 m runner in the world as well as the fourth best in the 100 m (following three other Jamaicans) by Track and Field News. She also finished eighth overall in voting for the magazine's Woman of the Year.

She qualified for her third World Championships by winning the 200 m national title. She beat runners up Shelly Ann Fraser and Simone Facey with a time of 22.40 seconds in June 2009, although a toe injury had left her lacking full fitness. 

At the 2009 World Championships Campbell-Brown was fourth in the 100 m final behind teammates Fraser and Stewart. She then won her second World 200 m silver behind American Allyson Felix. She closed the season at the Shanghai Golden Grand Prix, recording her fastest of the year (10.89) to take second behind Carmelita Jeter, who became the second fastest ever with 10.64 seconds. Although she was beaten by Jeter, Campbell-Brown was the fourth fastest 100 m sprinter overall that season.

In 2010, she won her first World Indoor 60m Gold medal in a time of 7.00. She later went on to run the fastest time for the 200 m in 21.98 in New York. She also ran a 10.78 in Eugene Oregon beating Fraser-Pryce and Jeter.

In 2011 Veronica Campbell-Brown won the Jamaican athletic trials in both the 100 & 200 m and was one of the favorites for both gold medals at the world championships in Daegu. At the championships she won the silver medal in the women's 100 m in 10.98 behind Jeter, who won in 10.90. She later went on to win her first 200 m world title in a timer of 22.22, beating Jeter and Felix who were second and third respectively. In 2015 Campbell made it to the Semi's and Finals of the World Championships 100 and 200m, Finishing 3rd in the 200m which was won by Dafne Schippers.

In 2012, she defended her 60m World Indoor Gold medal where she won in a time of 7.01. Later in June Veronica qualified for the 2012 Olympic games in London in both the 100 m and the 200 m. In the 100 m she came third behind Shelly Ann Fraser Pryce and Carmelita Jeter. In the 200 m she finished just outside the medals in 4th place, 0.24 of a second outside of bronze. In the 4 × 100 m relay final, she and the Jamaican team came second behind the U.S., which won in a new world record of 40.82 s.

In 2014, Campbell-Brown competed at the 2014 World Indoor Championships in Sopot, Poland, and over the 60 m race, ending up in 5th placed with a time of 7.13 s. In 2015, she competed at the 2015 World Championships in Athletics in Beijing, China, and participated in sprint events of 100 m, 200 m and 4 × 100 m relay—where she finished in fourth place with a time of 10.91 s, won the bronze medal with a time of 21.97 s and secured the gold with a time of 41.07 s respectively.

Campbell-Brown also for the 2016 Rio Olympics in the 200 m and 4 × 100 m relay. In the 200 m, she did not make it out of the heats and finished in 27th place with a time of 22.97 s but won the silver as part of the Jamaican team in the 4 × 100 m relay with a time of 41.36 s behind the US team, which finished with a time of 41.01 s, the second fastest time ever run for the event.

Positive doping test
On 14 June 2013, it was reported that Campbell-Brown had tested positive for diuretics while competing at the JAAA Supreme Ventures, a Jamaican meet. She was provisionally suspended from competition. Campbell-Brown denied that she had intentionally taken any banned substances. 

On 2 October 2013, she was cleared by the Jamaica Athletics Administrative Association (JAAA) to resume competition. The panel said this is not one of the most serious offences and it was appropriate that she should be given a public warning, with no ban from competition. They deemed she did not use the prohibited substance for performance enhancement. The substance in question—Lasix, not necessarily a performance-enhancing drug, but rather a potential masking agent for other banned substances—was contained in a cream the athlete had used for a leg injury.

The International Association of Athletics Federations appealed this decision at the Court of Arbitration for Sport. The court decided to clear Campbell-Brown of all doping charges as the JAAA doping procedures did not comply with required international standards.

Personal life
In 2007, Campbell married Omar Brown, a fellow Jamaican sprinter and University of Arkansas alumnus, changing her name to Campbell-Brown, a few years later she dropped the hyphen from her name, changing it to Campbell Brown. They currently live and train in Clermont, Florida. She was appointed as a UNESCO Goodwill Ambassador in late 2009, and stated that she would use the role to promote gender equity in sport.

Achievements
Campbell-Brown's personal best of 10.76 s in the 100 m ranks her all-time top fifteen in the world (tied 11th place) and sixth among Jamaican women. Her 200 m best (21.74 s) ranks her in the all-time top fifteen in the world. This time is the fifth best among Jamaican women. It is the tied sixth  fastest time of the 21st century, and was the fastest since Marion Jones's 21.62 s in Johannesburg 1998. She earned a total of 46 medals (27 gold, 16 silver, 3 bronze).

Personal bests

+ = en route to a longer distance

All information from IAAF Profile

Competition record

References

External links

Official Website

IAAF "Focus on Athletes" article
Veronica Campbell Photos

1982 births
Living people
Jamaican female sprinters
People from Trelawny Parish
Athletes (track and field) at the 2000 Summer Olympics
Athletes (track and field) at the 2002 Commonwealth Games
Athletes (track and field) at the 2004 Summer Olympics
Athletes (track and field) at the 2006 Commonwealth Games
Athletes (track and field) at the 2008 Summer Olympics
Athletes (track and field) at the 2012 Summer Olympics
Athletes (track and field) at the 2016 Summer Olympics
Commonwealth Games silver medallists for Jamaica
Commonwealth Games medallists in athletics
Olympic athletes of Jamaica
Olympic gold medalists for Jamaica
Olympic silver medalists for Jamaica
Olympic bronze medalists for Jamaica
University of Arkansas alumni
Arkansas Razorbacks women's track and field athletes
World Athletics Championships medalists
Medalists at the 2012 Summer Olympics
Medalists at the 2008 Summer Olympics
Medalists at the 2004 Summer Olympics
Barton Cougars women's track and field athletes
Junior college women's track and field athletes in the United States
Athletes (track and field) at the 2014 Commonwealth Games
World Athletics Championships athletes for Jamaica
World Athletics Indoor Championships winners
Medalists at the 2000 Summer Olympics
Commonwealth Games gold medallists for Jamaica
Olympic gold medalists in athletics (track and field)
Olympic silver medalists in athletics (track and field)
Olympic bronze medalists in athletics (track and field)
Medalists at the 2016 Summer Olympics
Diamond League winners
IAAF Continental Cup winners
World Athletics Championships winners
Olympic female sprinters
Medallists at the 2002 Commonwealth Games
Medallists at the 2006 Commonwealth Games
Medallists at the 2014 Commonwealth Games